Owen Benjamin Kares Troy-Smith (born May 24, 1980) is an American conspiracy theorist and internet personality. He was a stand-up comedian and actor who had minor roles in mainstream film and television between 2008 and 2015.

In the late 2010s, Benjamin began expressing more extreme political views. In 2019, he was banned from several mainstream social media platforms for violations of their policies, including Twitter, Facebook, Instagram, and YouTube. These included anti-Semitic remarks, homophobic remarks, and calling Barack Obama a nigger.

Early life
Benjamin was born to John Kares Smith and Jean Troy-Smith, both professors at Oswego State University. He attended Plattsburgh State College, where he worked at the student-run TV station.

Career

Acting and stand-up comedy (2004–2018) 
Benjamin starred in several web-only video series, including in the role of Owen on C-SPOT's 2008 Gaytown and the role of Chance Stevens on CBS Interactive's 2009 Heckle U. He also hosted Owen Benjamin Presents, a 2008 C-SPOT production.

In 2008, Benjamin had a supporting role in the comedy film The House Bunny. In 2009, he played the lead role in the romantic comedy film All's Faire in Love, co-starring with Christina Ricci. From 2012 to 2014, he portrayed Owen Walsh on the TBS original sitcom Sullivan & Son. He also appeared on the MTV show Punk'd, and twice as a correspondent on The Jay Leno Show. Benjamin hosted the annual ADG Excellence in Production Design Awards from 2014 to 2016. He hosted Esquire Network's The Next Great Burger in 2015.

Towards the end of the decade, Benjamin had established himself as what conservative commentator Bethany Mandel described as an "up-and-coming conservative comedian", booking comedy shows at university campuses. He hosted a podcast, Why Didn't They Laugh, on Sideshow Network. In October 2017, Benjamin tweeted his opposition to providing transgender children with hormone therapy, repeatedly referring to an NPR host as a "child molester" for raising a transgender child. This led the University of Connecticut to cancel an upcoming show, and Benjamin's talent agency dropped him as a client. In February 2018, Benjamin used a racial slur onstage in a performance in his hometown of Saranac Lake, New York, and more venues cancelled appearances. Mandel described these two events as the "beginning of the end of Benjamin’s mainstream career".

Political commentary (2018–present) 
Beginning in 2018, Benjamin appeared in two videos for conservative media company PragerU. During the various points in his live streams, Benjamin repeated anti-Semitic conspiracy tropes, referred to gay sex as "degeneracy", and called Barack Obama a nigger. He also was a guest on several shows by The Daily Wire, and podcasts including those of Joe Rogan and Steven Crowder. In September 2018, he appeared on InfoWars show, and in December was a guest on a show by Vox Day.

Views

Benjamin is part of the alt-right, and has espoused views rooted in white nationalism that are racist and antisemitic. Bethany Mandel has said that Benjamin, who was once a mainstream conservative comedian, became increasingly radicalized towards the end of the 2010s.

According to Insider, Benjamin supports antisemitic conspiracy theories. In October 2018, The Atlantic reported that Benjamin had a history of posting antisemitic memes on Instagram. In 2019, Right Wing Watch reported on Benjamin's statement that Adolf Hitler was trying to "clean Germany, clean it of the parasites, of the fleas", and his claims that Jews control the media. Right Wing Watch also reported on one of Benjamin's livestreams, where he said, "gays and Jews were considered the worst of the worst. Why? Because if they get power, they will destroy your entire civilization." Mandel has said that Benjamin has posted fabricated writing from the Talmud and spread antisemitic conspiracy theories, including Holocaust denial.

Right Wing Watch has reported that Benjamin believes in several other conspiracy theories, such as that the transgender rights movement is part of a eugenics program to reduce the world population, that the moon landing did not occur, and that the existence of dinosaurs was fabricated by the Smithsonian. In November 2019, he spoke at the Flat Earth International Conference in Dallas, Texas.

Social media bans 

Twitter banned Benjamin in 2018 after he made disparaging tweets about gun control advocate David Hogg. In October 2019, Patreon suspended Benjamin's account, saying he violated their terms of service regarding hate speech. His YouTube channel was banned on December 3, 2019, for violations of the site's terms of service. On December 13, he was suspended from Facebook and Instagram for multiple policy violations. He has also been banned by PayPal.

In January 2020, Benjamin and one hundred of his fans announced their intent to sue Patreon for $3.5million for banning him from the platform. Patreon counter-sued 72 of the fans. In July 2020, a judge on the San Francisco County Superior Court denied Patreon's request for a preliminary injunction in the case.

In March 2020, The Daily Dot reported that Benjamin had been attempting to circumvent his social media bans on several platforms to spread disinformation regarding COVID-19. Following the publication of the article, several of Benjamin's new accounts were terminated. After being banned from YouTube, Benjamin began streaming on DLive, a livestreaming service popular with extremists. In October 2020, Benjamin and Nick Fuentes were the two highest earners on the site. Following a November 2020 report by extremism researcher Megan Squire, DLive suspended several accounts including those belonging to Benjamin and Fuentes.

Personal life
In March 2008, he and Christina Ricci announced they were engaged, but they ended their engagement two months later. He later married and had children.

In 2021, after Benjamin began working on a project to create a compound on property he owns in Boundary County, Idaho, county residents filed a complaint with the county commissioners over allegations that he had violated zoning provisions, while expressing concerns that he was forming a "Ruby Ridge style" compound on the property.

References

External links

1980 births
American white nationalists
21st-century American comedians
21st-century American male actors
Alt-right
American conspiracy theorists
American Holocaust deniers
American male comedians
Comedians from New York (state)
COVID-19 conspiracy theorists
Discrimination against LGBT people in the United States
Flat Earth proponents
Living people
Male actors from New York (state)
Moon landing conspiracy theorists
People from Oswego, New York
State University of New York at Plattsburgh alumni